Cancellicula aethiopica is a species of sea snail, a marine gastropod mollusk in the family Cancellariidae, the nutmeg snails.

Description
The shell grows to a length of 4 mm.

Distribution
This species occurs in the Indian Ocean off Somalia.

References

 Verhecken A. (1997) Mollusca Gastropoda: Arafura Sea Cancellariidae collected during the Karubar cruise. In: A. Crosnier & P. Bouchet (eds), Résultats des campagnes Musorstom, volume 16. Mémoires du Muséum National d'Histoire Naturelle 172: 295–323. page(s): 316
 Verhecken A. (2011) The Cancellariidae of the Panglao Marine Biodiversity Project 2004 and the Panglao 2005 and Aurora 2007 deep sea cruises in the Philippines, with description of six new species (Neogastropoda, Cancellarioidea). Vita Malacologica 9: 1–60. [Published 31 May 2011]

Endemic fauna of Somalia
Cancellariidae
Gastropods described in 1925